Jeong Myeong-o (born 21 October 1963) is a South Korean racewalker. He competed in the men's 20 kilometres walk at the 1988 Summer Olympics.

References

1963 births
Living people
Athletes (track and field) at the 1988 Summer Olympics
South Korean male racewalkers
Olympic athletes of South Korea
Place of birth missing (living people)
20th-century South Korean people